Tamyanovo (Tamyan) is a rural locality (a selo) in Chekmagushevsky District, Bashkortostan, Russia. The population was 268 as of 2010. There are 5 streets.

Geography 
Tamyanovo is located 14 km northwest of Chekmagush (the district's administrative centre) by road. Novokutovo is the nearest rural locality.

References 

Rural localities in Chekmagushevsky District